Porcelain is a ceramic material.

Porcelain can also refer to porcelain enamel or to cast iron coated with industrial porcelain enamel.

Porcelain may also refer to:

Dentistry
Dental porcelain, porcelain used to create lifelike crowns, bridges, and veneers

Music
Porcelain (band), a Danish rock band

Albums
Porcelain, Helen Jane Long 2007
Porcelain (Emil Bulls album)
Porcelain (Matt Cardle album)
Porcelain (Sparta album)
Porcelain (EP), by Fuel
Porcelain, Julia Fordham's second album

Songs
"Porcelain" (song), a 1999 song by Moby, released as a single in 2000
"Porcelain", a song by the Pretenders from Extended Play
"Porcelain", a song from Californication by Red Hot Chili Peppers 
"Porcelain", a song from the EP Truant Wave by Patrick Stump
"Porcelain", a song by deadmau5 from A Little Oblique
"Porcelain", a song by Better Than Ezra
"Porcelain", a song by Tonedeff

Entertainment
Porcelain (play), a play by Chay Yew
Porcelain, a webcomic from Red Giant Entertainment

See also
Porcelaine, a French dog breed with a shiny white coat